Palamuse is a small borough in Jõgeva County, in Jõgeva Parish, Estonia, located about  southeast of the town of Jõgeva. It is passed by the Amme River. With a population of 551 (as of 1 January 2011)

Palamuse was the biggest settlement and the administrative centre of Palamuse Parish.

Palamuse is best known for being depicted in the Oskar Luts' 1912–1913 novel Spring (Kevade) as the settlement called "Paunvere". The 1969 film adaptation Spring was also filmed in Palamuse. His brother, filmmaker Theodor Luts (1896-1980) was born in Palamuse.

Palamuse was first mentioned in a letter by Pope Gregory IX on 20 November 1234.

Palamuse Church
The settlement evolved around the Palamuse St. Bartholomew's Church which was built in 1234 by the monks of the Kärkna Abbey. The church was reconstructed in Gothic style in the 15th century. Tower was added in the 19th century. In 1929 the church gained its today's interior.

Gallery

References

External links

Boroughs and small boroughs in Estonia